Benavente de Aragón is a locality located in the municipality of Graus, in Huesca province, Aragon, Spain. As of 2020, it has a population of 27.

Geography 
Benavente de Aragón is located 94km east of Huesca.

References

Populated places in the Province of Huesca